Igor Bortnitsky (born 13 June 1964) is a Soviet rower. He competed in the men's coxed four event at the 1992 Summer Olympics.

References

1964 births
Living people
Soviet male rowers
Olympic rowers of the Unified Team
Rowers at the 1992 Summer Olympics
Place of birth missing (living people)